The National Human Development Initiative is a program launched in 2005 by King Mohammed VI of Morocco with the objective of "ensuring a better distribution of the fruits of growth and to improve the living conditions of citizens". The program has a budget of 10 billion Dirham (about 900 million Euro) over five years (2006–2010). It is distributed equally between two country-wide programs (one called a "transversal program" and a "program against precarious living conditions") and two geographically targeted programs (an urban and a rural program). 60% of the program is financed by the national government, 20% by local governments and 20% is to be financed by external donors. For the urban program, committees at the local level identified 264 urban neighborhoods with the greatest needs in 30 cities that would benefit from the initiative. The neighborhoods have a population of 2.5m or 16% of the country's urban population. The rural program targets the 348 rural municipalities where the poverty level is higher than 30%.

The World Bank supports the initiative through a US$100 million loan  and a US$7 million grant to increase access to water supply and sanitation in three cities.

References 

Economy of Morocco
Mohammed VI of Morocco
Politics of Morocco